The Sojitz Kelanitissa Power Station (also known as Sojitz Power Station, and AES Kelanitissa Power Station), is privately-owned   diesel-fired combined cycle power station located in Kelanitissa, in the city of Colombo, Sri Lanka. It is owned by Sojitz Kelanitissa Private Limited, a subsidiary of Sojitz Corporation. The power station is located adjacent to the Kelanitissa Power Station, which is a separate government-owned power station.

Construction works were done by Larsen & Toubro. Like all power stations in Sri Lanka, power generated by the power station are sold to the Ceylon Electricity Board under a 20-year take-or-pay power purchase agreement. The low-sulfur diesel is supplied through an existing pipeline by the Ceylon Petroleum Corporation, with 20,000 tons, or the equivalent of 28-days of full capacity operations, stored in case of any fuel shortage. The plant is currently running on a 20-year contract, which ends on October 10, 2023.

History 
After the 1996 power crisis, in the midst of the Sri Lankan Civil War, the Government of Sri Lanka decided to invite IPPs to the country to increase the installed capacity.

In 2004, fire broke out at Sojitz Kelanitissa Power Station. The power station was shut down for restoration in 2004–2005.

See also 
 Kelanitissa Power Station
 List of power stations in Sri Lanka

References 

Oil-fired power stations in Sri Lanka
Buildings and structures in Colombo